Sandra Ringwald (born 27 September 1990) is a German former cross-country skier. She competed in the World Cup between 2011 and 2019.

She represented Germany at the FIS Nordic World Ski Championships 2015 in Falun.

She announced her retirement from cross-country skiing on 29 March 2019.

Cross-country skiing results
All results are sourced from the International Ski Federation (FIS).

Olympic Games

World Championships

World Cup

Season standings

Individual podiums
 1 podium – (1 )

Team podiums
 2 podiums (1 , 1 )

References

External links

1990 births
Living people
German female cross-country skiers
Tour de Ski skiers
Cross-country skiers at the 2018 Winter Olympics
Olympic cross-country skiers of Germany
People from Villingen-Schwenningen
Sportspeople from Freiburg (region)